Jyri Jukka Häkämies (born 30 August 1961) is a Finnish politician and the CEO of Confederation of Finnish Industries. He was Finnish Minister of Economic Affairs between 2011–2012, and a representative of the National Coalition Party, and the minister responsible for supervision of government enterprises with the exception of Patria, which is supervised by Jan Vapaavuori. He is also a member of the government's finance committee, a board member at YLE, the governmental supervisory board, Kotka city council and the Kymenlaakso regional board, where he is the chairman.

Häkämies was born in Karhula.  He holds a master's degree in political science.   Before entering the politics, he worked as the CEO of the Kymenlaakso chambers of commerce. Häkämies is a Senior Lieutenant in the military reserve. His older brother, Kari Häkämies, has also been a member of the parliament and government. Jyri Häkämies became the Finnish Minister of Defence in 2007 in Matti Vanhanen's second cabinet.

He was involved in a campaign finance controversy. His campaign received €10,000 from a company, whose representatives were later invited to a sauna evening on Ministry of Defence property, costing taxpayers €300. According to Arto Merisalo, a businessman involved, and later convicted and jailed due to misconduct in a related bankruptcy, Häkämies would participate in selection of candidates for specific campaign funding.

Häkämies worked to improve ethical standards for state-owned enterprises. He has advocated a whistleblower system.

Häkämies launched the largest electric car and electric car charging station project in the country's history.

Häkämies visited China in 2008 on the 19th anniversary of the Tiananmen square protests, but did not discuss human rights matters.

Environment 
Environmental politics professor Janne I. Hukkinen University of Helsinki criticized the new environmental administration of Finland. Häkämies was the responsible minister to introduce the new environment administration under the control of employment and business like in Russia. Competitiveness and environment are controlled by the same ministry. When the Talvivaara environmental problems became public, Häkämies resigned the minister job to the new post. Minister Ms. Paula Lehtomäki and Mr. Jyri Häkämies assigned one person responsible for all the permissions and control of the Talvivaara mine environmental control. If understood correctly this person worked before in the field of geology, not environment. Professor Mr. Janne Hukkinen demanded independent environmental administration back that has the opportunity to open critics of the business interests.

Personal life

See also 
 Talvivaara

References

External links
 
 Finnish Defence Ministry's web pages
 Jyri Häkämies' page at Finnish Parliament site

1961 births
Living people
People from Kotka
National Coalition Party politicians
Ministers of Defence of Finland
Ministers of Trade and Industry of Finland
Members of the Parliament of Finland (1999–2003)
Members of the Parliament of Finland (2003–07)
Members of the Parliament of Finland (2007–11)
Members of the Parliament of Finland (2011–15)
Recipients of the Order of the Cross of Terra Mariana, 2nd Class